Utarkul (Utarkül) is a rural locality (a village) in Kebyachevsky Selsoviet, Aurgazinsky District, Bashkortostan, Russia. The population was 68 as of 2010. There is 1 street.

Geography 
Utarkul is located 13 km southeast of Tolbazy (the district's administrative centre) by road. Tashlykul is the nearest rural locality.

References 

Rural localities in Aurgazinsky District